The following are the Indonesia national under-17 football team results.

2017

2018

2019

2022

References

Under-17
Under-17 association football